Jean-Pierre Tokoto (born 26 January 1948) is a retired Cameroonian professional footballer. He competed for the Cameroon national team at the 1982 FIFA World Cup.

Career

Club
In March 1980, Tokoto signed with the New England Tea Men of the North American Soccer League.  In 1981, the team moved to Florida and renamed itself the Jacksonville Tea Men.  In the fall of 1981, Tokoto moved to the Philadelphia Fever of the Major Indoor Soccer League.

In 2006, he was selected by CAF as one of the best 200 African football players of the last 50 years.

Coaching
Jean-Pierre Tokoto was director of coaching at Schwaben AC, a youth soccer team based in Buffalo Grove, Illinois.  After many successful years at the club, in 2009 he left the team to create a new club, FC TOKOTO, a college preparatory soccer academy. He now coaches a U-17 and U-16 team for  Lions '82 SC a team based in the Rockford Illinois area.

Personal life
Tokoto's grandson, also named Jean-Pierre, is a basketball player who was drafted in 2015 by the Philadelphia 76ers of the NBA.

Honours
Oryx
Cameroonian Championship: 1963, 1964, 1965, 1967
Cameroon Cup: 1963, 1968
African Cup of Champions Clubs: 1965

Marseille
French Championship: 1972

See also
1982 FIFA World Cup squads

References

External links
 
 NASL/MISL stats
 fctokoto.com

Living people
1948 births
American soccer coaches
Association football forwards
Cameroonian footballers
Cameroon international footballers
1982 FIFA World Cup players
1972 African Cup of Nations players
FC Girondins de Bordeaux players
Ligue 1 players
Ligue 2 players
Philadelphia Fever (MISL) players
Major Indoor Soccer League (1978–1992) players
New England Tea Men players
Jacksonville Tea Men players
North American Soccer League (1968–1984) players
North American Soccer League (1968–1984) indoor players
Olympique de Marseille players
Paris Saint-Germain F.C. players
Cameroonian expatriate footballers
Cameroonian expatriate sportspeople in the United States
Expatriate soccer players in the United States
Cameroonian expatriate sportspeople in France
Expatriate footballers in France